English-American musician, DJ, singer, songwriter, record producer and record executive Mark Ronson has released five studio albums and twenty-two singles.

Here Comes the Fuzz, Ronson's debut studio album, was released in 2003 and was critically acclaimed and a financial success, despite initially poor sales. It included three top 10 hits and won Ronson a Brit Award for British Male Solo Artist in 2008. The best known song from the album, "Ooh Wee", samples "Sunny" by Boney M. and features Nate Dogg, Ghostface Killah, Trife Da God, and Saigon. It was featured that year in the film Honey and its soundtrack. The song was later used in Hitch and Harold & Kumar Escape from Guantanamo Bay.

Version, Ronson's second studio album, was released in 2007. Ronson released a cover of The Smiths' track "Stop Me If You Think You've Heard This One Before" under the title "Stop Me" on 2 April 2007, featuring singer Daniel Merriweather, which reached number two on the UK Singles Chart. The album also spawned a hit in the song "Valerie" sung by Amy Winehouse, a cover of another UK chart hit by The Zutons.

Record Collection, Ronson's third studio album, was released in 2010. The first single "Bang Bang Bang", which featured rapper Q-Tip and singer MNDR, was released on 12 July 2010, where it peaked at number 6 on the UK Singles Chart, giving Ronson his fourth top 10 hit. The second single from the album, "The Bike Song", was released on 19 September 2010 and features Kyle Falconer from The View and Spank Rock.

Uptown Special, Ronson's fourth studio album, was released on 13 January 2015. On 30 October 2014, Ronson announced on Twitter the release of the lead single of his upcoming album on 10 November 2014. The single, "Uptown Funk" features vocals from Bruno Mars. The song was performed on Saturday Night Live on 21 November 2014. "Uptown Funk" topped the Billboard Hot 100 on 7 January 2015, knocking Taylor Swift from the top spot. It gave Ronson his first number-one single in the US and Mars' sixth. The song has sold over 2.5 million copies in the US as of January 2015. The song also reached number one on the pop charts in the UK, Canada and Australia.

Albums

Studio albums

Soundtrack album

Singles

As lead artist

As featured artist

Promotional singles

Other charted songs

Notes

References

Discographies of British artists